Vishnevka is a rural locality (a selo) and the administrative center of Vishnyovsky Selsoviet, Rubtsovsky District, Altai Krai, Russia. The population was 365 as of 2013. There are 5 streets.

Geography 
Vishnevka is located 40 km southeast of Rubtsovsk (the district's administrative centre) by road. Romanovka and Novonikolayevka are the nearest rural localities.

References 

Rural localities in Rubtsovsky District